Kohei Aoki (born December 13, 1980), nicknamed Cohey,  is a Japanese former professional basketball player who last played for Rizing Fukuoka of the bj League in Japan. He played college basketball for Senshu University.

Career statistics
Born in Minami Ward, Fukuoka City, Fukuoka Prefecture. Entered  Nishi Nagasumi Elementary School in Fukuoka City, and at the end of the 3rd grade, started playing mini-basketball at the invitation of a friend and participated in a national tournament. In junior high school, he entered Nagaoka Junior High School in Fukuoka City, a strong school, and participated in national tournaments.
In high school, he entered Fukuoka University Ohori High School, one of the most prestigious high schools in Japan, where he was in the top 4 at the Inter-High School Championships as a freshman, 4th at the National Athletic Meet in the same year, and in the Winter Cup, where he was in the top 16. They lost to Hokuriku High School in the first round.

Regular season 

|-
| align="left" |  2005-06
| align="left" | Apache
| 33 ||7  || 20.0 || .434 || .380 || bgcolor="CFECEC"| .879 || 2.1 || 1.9 || 1.1 || .0 || 1.0 || 6.6
|-
| align="left" | 2006-07
| align="left" | Apache
| 40 || 27 || 28.1 || .394 || .331 || bgcolor="CFECEC"| .933 || 2.3 || 2.5 || 1.4 || .0 || 2.1 || 12.3
|-
| align="left" |  2007-08
| align="left" | Apache
| 42 || 27 || 29.1 || .425 || .400 || .895 || 1.6 || 3.2 || 1.1 || .0 || 2.2 || 15.8
|-
| align="left" | 2008-09
| align="left" | Apache
| 51 || 10 || 27.8 || .399 || .344 || bgcolor="CFECEC"| .914 || 1.6 || 2.8 || 1.0 || .0 || 1.8 || 13.3
|-
| align="left" |  2009-10
| align="left" |Apache
| 52 ||45 || 32.7 || .425 || .365 || .876 || 1.9 || 2.9 || 1.2 || .0 || 2.3 || 15.2
|-
| align="left" | 2010-11
| align="left" | Apache
| 32 || 31 || 31.5 || .468 || .382 || .797 || 1.8 || 2.2 || 1.0 || .0 || 1.3 || 12.3
|-
| align="left" | 2011-12
| align="left" | Osaka
| 52 || 49 || 29.0 || .462 ||.486  ||  bgcolor="CFECEC"|.895 ||2.1  ||2.1  ||0.8  || 0 || 1.0 || 11.6
|-
| align="left" |  2012-13
| align="left" | Tokyo CR
| 49 || 43 ||32.8 || .445 ||.433  ||.889  || 2.8 || 2.6 || 1.1 || 0 ||1.7  || 14.4
|-
| align="left" |  2013-14
| align="left" | Fukuoka
| 52 || 16 || 22.4 || .480 || .436 || .856 || 1.5 || 1.5 || 1.0 || .1 || 1.1 || 9.6
|-
| align="left" | 2014-15
| align="left" | Fukuoka
| 36||32 || 29.2|| .461|| .392|| bgcolor="CFECEC"| .933|| 1.9|| 2.2|| 0.8|| .0|| 1.4|| 10.8
|-
| align="left" | 2015-16
| align="left" | Fukuoka
| 45||15 || 23.9|| .411|| .401|| bgcolor="CFECEC"| .945|| 1.7|| 1.9|| 0.9|| .0|| 1.2|| 11.0
|-

References

External links
 
 

1980 births
Living people
Osaka Evessa players
Rizing Zephyr Fukuoka players
Japanese men's basketball players
Japan national 3x3 basketball team players
Sportspeople from Iwate Prefecture
Tokyo Apache players
Tokyo Cinq Rêves players